Cabinda Airport  is an airport serving Cabinda, a city in the Cabinda Province, an exclave of Angola.

Airlines and destinations

See also
 List of airports in Angola
 Transport in Angola

References

External links
 OurAirports - Cabinda
 Photograph of Aeroporto de Cabinda (2003)
 Photograph of Aeroporto de Cabinda (2009)
 
 

Airports in Angola
Cabinda Province